Curse of Existence is the seventh studio album by American metalcore band Miss May I. It was released on September 2, 2022 through SharpTone Records and was produced by Will Putney.

Background and recording
On October 6, 2020, Miss May I announced that they are working on new material for the forthcoming album. March 30, 2021, the band have concluded the recording sessions for their new album. On May 24, 2022, they revealed the album itself, the album cover, the track list, and release date.

Critical reception

The album received positive reviews from critics. Katie Bird of Distorted Sound scored the album 8 out of 10 and said: "Despite falling into the trappings of a slightly cliché ending, Miss May I have proved that the wait is worth it. They have improved upon their sound by delightfully mixing deathcore, melodic and clean vocals to make a unique take on the metalcore sound. This band have shown that they always have a new trick up their sleeve, and can still surprise fans to this day. This album was five years in the making, and it shows that Miss May I can still be unique in a genre that sometimes grows stale. Curse of Existence is one of the most interesting metalcore albums this year, and whilst it won't please everyone, it will be a great album for both newcomers and fans of the band."

Rock 'N' Load praised the album saying, "Curse of Existence is ten songs full of emotion and intensity, a solid offering from Miss May I. This is their second album released on Sharptone Records and they've outdone themselves with this one; completely worth the wait." Wall of Sound gave the album a score 8/10 and saying: "So have Miss May I returned to Monument form with Curse of Existence? I think it is as close as they have been. The boys have got a bit more aggressive overall, the guitar riffage is a bit more furious, the chorus' are huge, and there is no shortage of gigantic breakdowns. The band certainly ain't breaking any new barriers but I think they've taken everything they've learnt over the years and put it together to create one hell of a modern metalcore album. I'll be spinning this one for a while!"

Track listing
Adapted from Apple Music.

Personnel
Credits adapted from Discogs.

Miss May I
 Levi Benton – unclean vocals
 B.J. Stead – lead guitar, backing vocals
 Justin Aufdemkampe – rhythm guitar, backing vocals, additional production
 Ryan Neff – bass, clean vocals
 Jerod Boyd – drums, percussion

Additional personnel
 Will Putney – production, engineering, mixing, mastering
 Nick Sampson – additional production, additional engineering
 Ben Johnson – additional production
 Steve Seid – additional engineering
 Jackie Andersen and Shawn Keith – A&R
 Jim Hughes – artwork, layout

References

2022 albums
Miss May I albums
SharpTone Records albums